A. Tabatabaei was an Iranian military officer who served as the acting Commander of the Islamic Republic of Iran Navy for a short period of time in summer 1980.

References

Commanders of Islamic Republic of Iran Navy
Missing middle or first names
Year of birth missing
Possibly living people